Chris Via (born March 9, 1992) is an American professional ten-pin bowler from Springfield, Ohio known for winning the 2021 U.S. Open. Chris uses the two-handed shovel-style delivery with a dominant right hand. He competes in events on the PBA Tour and has also bowled internationally as a member of Team USA.

Via rolled the PBA Tour's 30th-ever televised perfect 300 game, accomplished February 7, 2021 at the East Region Finals of the 2021 PBA Players Championship. At the PBA Tour Finals on June 27, 2021, in Allen Park, Michigan, Via rolled the PBA's 32nd televised 300 game. He joined Sean Rash and François Lavoie as the only players in history to score 300 in two televised PBA Tour title events. Jason Belmonte would roll his second televised 300 game in 2022 to also join this group. Chris is the only one of the four to roll both of his 300 games in the same season.

Via is a pro staff member for Storm bowling balls and Turbo Grips inserts.

Early life
Via claims to have been bowling since age 1. He bowled in a Saturday morning league with an older sister until age 12, took a break to play on a traveling basketball team for a few years, then returned to bowling at age 15. He attended Kenton Ridge High School in Springfield, Ohio. His high school teams won the Ohio state bowling championships in 2009 and 2010.

Amateur career
Via bowled collegiately at Notre Dame College in South Euclid, Ohio. While earning his degree in accounting, his bowling prowess won him National Collegiate All-American honors in three straight seasons (2011–12, 2012–13 and 2013–14). He was a member of Junior Team USA in 2011 and 2012, and won a Team Gold Medal at the 2012 World Youth Bowling Championships.  While in college, he won a 2013 PBA Regional Tour event as a non-member. Chris went on to win the 2016 U.S. Amateur Championship, securing the title with a final match victory over Kamron Doyle. This earned Via a spot on Team USA for 2016, and he would remain a Team USA member through 2018. Following his breakout 2021 PBA season, Via was again a member of Team USA for 2022 and 2023 

Via represented the US in the 2021 Weber Cup, an annual USA vs. Europe competition. In the USA's 17–18 loss to Team Europe, Via participated in 11 of 35 matches, going 3–1 in singles, 2–2 in doubles, and 0–3 in team.

Professional career
Via joined the Professional Bowlers Association in 2017.  In his first full season, he cashed in 12 of 20 events, made match play 7 times, made one championship round appearance, and won his first Regional Tour title as a PBA member.  He made only one more championship round appearance over the next two seasons, while winning another Regional title in 2019.

After appearing in the televised finals of four PBA majors between 2020 and 2021 without winning, Via won his first national PBA Tour title and first major at the 2021 U.S. Open. Having qualified as the #1 seed for the April 11 finals, Via won his lone TV match over second-seeded Jakob Butturff by a single pin, 214–213. Via finished third in the 2021 Chris Schenkel PBA Player of the Year voting, behind Kyle Troup and François Lavoie, while also finishing second in Tour points (behind Troup), and sixth in earnings ($125,210).

Personal
In addition to earning a living on the lanes, Via co-owns TV Bowling Supply in Columbus, Ohio with fellow PBA member Michael Tang. Chris now resides in Blacklick, Ohio.

References

American ten-pin bowling players
1992 births
Living people